Lea Lorien is an American female singer/songwriter and occasional actress from New York City, New York who is the daughter of guitarist Carlos Alomar and singer Robin Clark (both were performers on David Bowie's 1975 Young Americans album, which featured Alomar's guitar performance on "Fame").  She was born in 1977.

She is the lead vocalist on David Morales' 2004 number one Billboard Hot Dance Music/Club Play song "How Would U Feel", from the 2 Worlds Collide CD, on which she performs four other tracks. The song charted at #18 on the Billboard Hot 100 in 2004. It also went on to feature in the "Episodes from Liberty City" expansions for Grand Theft Auto IV as the first track to play on the reformatted version of the Vladivostok FM radio station.

Lea Lorien's "Not Easy" appears on Independent Soul Divas released September 2008 (Lola Waxx Records (UK)). The song first appeared on Lem Springsteen's Terminal Love album on which Lea was a featured vocalist.

She is also the voice of Sunny Funny in the sequel to the Original PaRappa game, PaRappa the Rapper 2 for the PlayStation 2.

See also
List of number-one dance hits (United States)
List of artists who reached number one on the US Dance chart

References

External links

American dance musicians
American house musicians
American people of Puerto Rican descent
Hispanic and Latino American musicians
Living people
21st-century American singers
21st-century American women singers
Year of birth missing (living people)